Cinquefoils and silverweeds of the genera Argentina, Comarum Dasiphora, Drymocallis, Potentilla and Sibbaldiopsis (formerly all included in Potentilla) are used as food plants by the caterpillars of some Lepidoptera species, including:

Monophagous
Species which feed exclusively on cinquefoils

Coleophoridae
 Coleophora albicostella – only on grey cinquefoil (P. cinerea)

Hesperiidae
 Foulquier's grizzled skipper (Pyrgus bellieri) – on various Potentilla species
 Carline skipper (Pyrgus carlinae) – only on spring cinquefoil (P. neumanniana)
 Cinquefoil skipper (Pyrgus cirsii) – only on spring cinquefoil (P. neumanniana)
 Rosy grizzled skipper (Pyrgus onopordi) – on various Potentilla species
 Olive skipper (Pyrgus serratulae) – on various Potentilla species

Polyphagous
Species which feed on cinquefoils and other plants

Coleophoridae
 Coleophora potentillae – on various Potentilla species

Hesperiidae
 Large grizzled skipper (Pyrgus alveus) – on various Potentilla species
 Oberthür's grizzled skipper (Pyrgus armoricanus) – on various Potentilla species
 Grizzled skipper (Pyrgus malvae) – recorded on common tormentil (P. erecta), barren strawberry (P. sterilis) and creeping cinquefoil (P. reptans)

Lasiocampidae
 Malacosoma alpicolum – recorded on Potentilla aurea

Lycaenidae
 Lycaena dorcas – recorded on shrubby cinquefoil (Dasiphora fruticosa)

Saturniidae
 Emperor moth (Pavonia pavonia) – on various Potentilla species

External links

Cinquefoils
+Lepidoptera
+Lepidoptera